Jerry Jost (died December 30, 2014) was an American sound engineer. He was nominated for an Academy Award in the category Best Sound for the film The Turning Point.

Selected filmography
 The Turning Point (1977)

References

External links

2014 deaths
Year of birth missing
American audio engineers